The Eritrean Navy is a smaller branch of the Eritrean Defence Forces. It is responsible for the security of the entire coastline of Eritrea, more than 1,100 km, as well as the Eritrean territorial waters.

History
The Eritrean Navy of today is said to have been an outgrowth of the Eritrean Liberation Front's sea transport operations early in the Eritrean War of Independence. This continued as a part of the Eritrean People's Liberation Front (EPLF) after the split of the organizations. After the Second Congress of the EPLF an offensive force was proposed and created with a base in Sudan.

These forces played a critical role at the Battle of Massawa when they sank several Ethiopian warships in the harbor. At the close of the Eritrean War of Independence, the balance of the Ethiopian Navy was inherited by this naval force.

Currently
Since independence the Eritrean Navy has expanded its fleet of high-speed patrol boats. This branch of the Eritrean Defence Forces served with distinction under the command of  Tewolde Kelati. The current Commander of the Eritrean Naval Forces is Major General Hummed Ahmed Karikare. The Eritrean Naval Forces Headquarters is in Massawa. 
Through Proclamation 104 the Eritrean Navy is empowered by the Ministry of the Fisheries to enforce fisheries-related laws on behalf of the Ministry.

Naval ships

Weapons
  Gabriel SSM
  SS-N-2 Styx SSM

Facilities
 Massawa - Naval HQ 
 Assab - ship repair facility
 Embaticalla - former marine commando training school
 Dahlak

References

Military of Eritrea
Eritrea